is a Japanese lightweight kickboxer. He won the championship of Rajadamnern Stadium in Muay Thai  at Super lightweight.

His entrance music is Spente Le Stelle.

Biography

Wins Japanese national title
On January 23, 2000, he fought against Shingo Takayama's SNKA Japanese lightweight championship. He won by KO in 2nd round. Ishii defended this title 8 times until 2007.

Against Somluck Kamsing
On November 6, 2004, he fought against Somluck Kamsing from Thailand. The bout was resulted as draw (30-30, 30-30, 30-30) in the end of 3rd round.

Wins Rajadamnern Stadium title
On October 2, 2011, Ishii fought against Apisak K.T. Gym for the vacant title of Rajadamnern Stadium championship at super lightweight. He won by the unanimous decision and He became the 5th non-Thai champions of the two stadiums in Muay Thai.

He lost his title to Aikpet Mor. Krongthepthonburi at Magnum 31 in Tokyo on March 10, 2013 when he was knocked out with an elbow in the fourth by the Thai.

He lost to Kaew Fairtex by second round high kick KO for a WPMF super lightweight championship at Rikix: No Kick, No Life 2014 in Tokyo, Japan on February 11, 2014.

Fight record

Titles

Amateur
 Kings Cup Tournament Runner-up (1997)
 2007 Asian Indoor Games, Muay, Welterweight Runner-up (November 3, 2007)

Professional
 TOUITSU Lightweight champion (2008)
 Shin Nihon Kickboxing Association Lightweight champion
 Rajadamnern Stadium Super lightweight champion

Awards
 37th 2004 Japan Professional Sports Grand Prize, Fresh Award (January 24, 2005)

See also
 Muay Thai
 Rajadamnern Stadium

References

External links
 GON KICK GON LIFE HIROKI "GON" ISHII Official Web Site
 Hiroki Ishii Official Blog

1979 births
Living people
Japanese male kickboxers
Lightweight kickboxers